Bernhard Stephan (born 24 January 1943) is a German film director and screenwriter. His 1978 film Jörg Ratgeb – Painter was entered into the 28th Berlin International Film Festival.

Selected filmography
 Jörg Ratgeb – Painter (1978)

References

External links

1943 births
Living people
People from Potsdam
Mass media people from Brandenburg